Steavenson may refer to:

Addison Langhorne Steavenson (1836–1913), English Mining Engineer
Wendell Steavenson, American journalist, and writer
William Herbert Steavenson FRAS (1894–1975), English amateur astronomer

See also
Steavenson Falls, a waterfall on the Steavenson River
Steavenson River in the Australian state of Victoria
Stephenson
Stevenson